The Middle Atlantic Athletic Association (MAAA or M3A) formation date is unknown (circa early 1930s). An article suggests the M3A was formed in 1931–32.  This association or what now are known as "conferences" was able to bring together several historically black colleges from middle eastern states to compete for titles in all sports.  The Baltimore Afro-American, an African American newspaper features several articles with the teams from the M3A.  It includes scores, championship and information pertaining to the schools. The schools that made up this conference were:

 Bowie Normal School
 Bordentown School
 Downingtown Industrial and Agricultural School (Downies)
 Princess Anne Academy (Trojans)
 Delaware State College (Hornets)
 Cheyney State Normal School
 Storer College

Football champions
 1934 – Delaware State
 1935 – Delaware State
 1936 – Cheyney

See also
 List of defunct college football conferences

References

Defunct college sports conferences in the United States
College sports in Delaware
Middle Atlantic Athletic Association